Chaminade College School (CCS, Chaminade) is an all-boys Catholic secondary school in Toronto, Ontario, Canada.

History
Founded by the Archdiocese of Toronto, Chaminade College School opened its doors in September 1965.  Initially under the control of the Society of Mary (the Marianists), the school was named for the Society's founder, Father William Joseph Chaminade.

The mandate of the school was to prepare young men for post-secondary education in a traditional Catholic secondary school environment. The school's motto "Fortes in fide" emphasizes the importance of the virtue of faith in the life of the Catholic school.

In 1967, Chaminade began a partnership with the Metropolitan Separate School Board (now Toronto Catholic District School Board).  In this partnership, the Board conducted the first two years of secondary school, and the Archdiocese conducted the remaining three years.  In September 1972, the Irish Christian Brothers took over administration of the school, until their departure in June 1988. The school is currently administered entirely by the TCDSB after funding was expanded while the religious identity of the school was preserved.

The school won a Green Toronto award in 2007 for its pioneering efforts in establishing the Adopt a Stream project that became a citywide model for waterway cleanup. In 2008, students circulated a petition which resulted in the Province of Ontario outlawing smoking in automobiles when children are passengers.

Chaminade is also known for its athletic achievements with former Gryphons Tevaun Smith and James Bodanis moving on to play football in the NCAA and the CFL. The school is also home to several chess masters such as Vietnamese child prodigies Hoàng Nguyên and Henry Vu as well as Filipino child prodigy Jeric Palima.

Nadia Pasquini, a veteran teacher at Chaminade, received the Prime Minister's Award for Teaching Excellence for the 2016–2017 school year. Pasquini's feats include fundraising over $24,000 for the Free the Children organization as well as partnering with the Working Against Violence Everyday group to raise awareness about screen addiction.

Overview

Concert Band
The Chaminade Concert Band is led by the lone music teacher at Chaminade College School, Zachary Laidlaw. In 2008 Alex Voros (the previous music teacher) was named Canada's MusiCounts Teacher of the Year by the music education charity of the Canadian Academy of Recording Arts and Sciences.

Hockey Program
Chaminade College School has a well known hockey program that has help produce and shape many NHL, OHL, NCAA, CIS and OJHL level players over the years. Notable NHL Alumni includes the likes of Jason Wooley, Mark Giordano, Gino and Paul Cavallini, Michael Vernace and Akim Aliu. The hockey program consists of a contact varsity / senior team (grades 9 to 12) and a non-contact varsity team (grades 9 to 12). The program is run by Luigi Vigilanti and Marcus Mason.

TCDAA/MSSB Championship Banners: Junior - [1994, 2000] Senior - [1993] Varsity A - [*] Varsity B - [2020]

Notable alumni

Señor Blue Jay
Tevaun Smith
Lukas Rossi
Olu Famutimi
Jason Woolley
Mark Giordano
Gino Cavallini
Paul Cavallini
Miguel Cañizalez
Michael Vernace
Martin Broda

Merwin Mondesir
Michael Lombardi

See also

List of high schools in Ontario

References

External links
Chaminade College School

Toronto Catholic District School Board
High schools in Toronto
Catholic secondary schools in Ontario
Educational institutions established in 1964
Congregation of Christian Brothers schools in Canada
Marianist schools
1964 establishments in Ontario
North York
Boys' schools in Canada